The 2007 Braintree District Council election took place on 3 May 2007 to elect members of Braintree District Council in England. This was on the same day as other local elections.

Results summary

Ward results

Black Notley and Terling

Bocking Blackwater

Bocking North

Bocking South

Bradwell, Silver End and Rivenhall

Braintree Central

Braintree East

Braintree South

Bumpstead

Coggeshall and North Feering

Cressing and Stisted

Gosfield and Greenstead Green

Great Notley and Braintree West

Halstead St. Andrew's

Halstead Trinity

Hatfield Peveral

Hedingham and Maplestead

Kelvedon

Panfield

Rayne

Stour Valley North

Stour Valley South

The Three Colnes

Three Fields

Upper Colne

Witham Chipping Hill and Central

Witham North

Witham South

Witham West

Yeldham

By-elections

Braintree East

Hatfield Peveral

Witham West

The Three Colnes

Braintree South

A by-election was called due to the disqualification of Cllr Russell Wilkins (Conservative) for non-attendance.

References

Braintree District Council elections
2007 English local elections
May 2007 events in the United Kingdom
2000s in Essex